Äntu is a village in Väike-Maarja Parish, Lääne-Viru County, in northeastern Estonia. It has a population of 50 (as of 1 January 2011).

Äntu Hill Fort
Äntu Hill Fort (or Punamägi Hill Fort, according to old sources Agelinde) is located in this village. The fort was established at the beginning of 11th century. The fort is mentioned in "Livonian Chronicle of Henry".

Gallery

See also
 Äntu lakes

References

Villages in Lääne-Viru County